Penrice may refer to:

Penrice, South Australia, a small town in the Barossa Valley in Australia
Penrice, Swansea, a community in Wales
Penrice Castle, near Penrice, Swansea
Penrice Community College, a comprehensive school in St Austell, Cornwall
Penrice Soda Products, in South Australia
Gary Penrice, English former footballer
James Penrice, Scottish footballer
Major John Penrice, author of a glossary of the Quran (1873)